NRRC may refer to:

Nuclear Risk Reduction Center
Nepal Risk Reduction Consortium